Brădeni is a commune located in Sibiu County, Transylvania, Romania. It is composed of three villages: Brădeni, Retiș (Retersdorf; Réten) and Țeline (Woßling; Pusztacelina).

Geography
The commune is located in the northeastern part of Sibiu County, on the border with the Mureș and Brașov counties. It lies in the middle of the Transylvanian Plateau, on the banks of the river Hârtibaciu. 

County road DJ106 connects Brădeni to the county seat, Sibiu, 
 to the southwest, and to Sighișoara,  to the north. County road DJ104D leads to Făgăraș,  to the south.

Architecture
A hall-shaped Lutheran church was erected by the local Transylvanian Saxon community in the 14th century.

Natives
 (1919–2001), poet, journalist, and translator
Remus Răduleț (1904–1984), electrical engineer

References

Augustin Ioan, Hanna Derer. The Fortified Churches of the Transylvanian Saxons. Noi Media Print, 2004

External links

Communes in Sibiu County
Localities in Transylvania